Trachypedoula is a village in the Paphos District of Cyprus, located 5 km south of Salamiou.

References

Communities in Paphos District